Dolores Hart, O.S.B. (born Dolores Hicks; October 20, 1938) is an American Roman Catholic Benedictine nun and former actress. Following her movie debut with Elvis Presley in Loving You (1957), she made 10 films in five years, including Wild Is the Wind (1957), King Creole (1958), and Where the Boys Are (1960). 

At the height of her career,  Hart left acting to enter the Abbey of Regina Laudis monastery in Connecticut.

Background
Born Dolores Hicks, Hart was the only child of actor Bert Hicks and Harriett Hicks. Hart's father followed movie offers and moved his family from Chicago to Hollywood. Hart decided to become an actress after visiting her father on movie sets, including the film Forever Amber.

Hart was also related by marriage, through an aunt, to singer Mario Lanza. She lived in Chicago with her grandparents, who sent her to a parochial school, St. Gregory Catholic School, not for its religious education but because it was closest to home and she stated, "My grandparents didn't want me to get run over by streetcars." It was actually her grandfather, a movie theater projectionist to whom she turned for comfort in light of her parents' marital problems, whose enthusiasm for films influenced her decision to pursue an acting career. She would watch the films, but without sound so as not to disturb his naps in the booth, and her job was to wake him at the end of each reel.

Hart converted to Roman Catholicism when she was 10. By age 11, she was living again in Beverly Hills with her mother, a restaurant greeter, who married owner Al Gordon. After high school, she studied at Marymount College near Los Angeles. Using the stage name of 'Dolores Hart' in 1956 she was signed to play a supporting role as the love interest to Elvis Presley in the 1957 release Loving You. After this appearance, Hart found herself in frequent demand, and she made two more films before appearing with Presley again in 1958's King Creole. She has denied ever having had an 'intimate' relationship with Presley off-screen. In interviews during her movie career she was often asked, "What is it like kissing Elvis?" She chuckled a bit at the memory, "I think the limit for a screen kiss back then was something like 15 seconds. That one has lasted 40 years." Hart then made her debut on Broadway, winning a 1959 Theatre World Award as well as a Tony Award nomination for Best Featured Actress for her role in The Pleasure of His Company.

In 1960, Hart starred in Where the Boys Are, a teenage comedy about college students on spring break, which developed a near cult-like following. In the film Hart plays a co-ed who struggles to define herself when confronted with her newly discovered sexuality and popularity with the opposite sex. Hart starred in the film Francis of Assisi in 1961, in which she played Saint Clare of Assisi. She also made a sketch of a St. Francis statue, arms outstretched, while working on the movie.
She went on to star in four more films, including the lead role of Lisa in The Inspector, which was based on a novel by Jan de Hartog, and nominated for a Golden Globe for "Best Picture – Drama".

In 1963 Hart appeared as Kathy Maywood on The Virginian in the episode "The Mountain of the Sun". Hart played a Catholic missionary, who against all warnings risks her life to honor both her vows to God and her desire to continue her dead husband's work to help a community of poor and sick embattled Indian tribes. It was perhaps a foreshadowing of her soon-to-be religious life. It was her last released acting role (April 17, 1963), a month after Hart's last film role in Come Fly with Me with Hugh O'Brian. At this point she had made up her mind to leave the film industry. The 24-year-old actress became a Roman Catholic nun at the Benedictine Abbey of Regina Laudis in Bethlehem, Connecticut. On a 1963 New York promotional stop for Come Fly with Me, she took a one-way car ride to the abbey in 1963 (but not in a limousine as reported).

It was during the filming of Come Fly With Me that she became close friends with Karl Malden, who also starred in the picture. Malden wrote in his autobiography When Do I Start? that when he and his wife Mona wanted to go out, Dolores would spend time babysitting their kids. She adored the Maldens' children and quickly became like a member of the family. It was shortly after the picture that Dolores got engaged and she actually asked Malden's daughters Mila and Carla to be her bridesmaids. It was after they had a couple of fittings on their dresses that Dolores appeared at the Maldens’ and announced she was calling off the wedding. A few days later she came over with what amounted to all her worldly possessions, jewelry, purses and knick-knacks, and told the girls to take what they wanted. She said she was moving away and that it was "an affair of the heart" (her exact words quoted by Malden). She not only left behind her fiancé, she left her acting career as well.

Even though she broke off her engagement to Los Angeles architect Don Robinson (April 16, 1933 – November 29, 2011), they remained close friends: she admitted she loved him—"Of course, Don, I love you." But Robinson said, "Every love doesn't have to wind up at the altar." He never married, and visited her every year at Christmas and Easter at the abbey in Connecticut until his death.

Vocational calling

While Hart was making Francis of Assisi in Rome, she met Pope John XXIII, who was instrumental in her vocation. She told him "I am Dolores Hart, the actress playing Clare." The Pontiff replied, "Tu sei Chiara!" ("No, you are Clare!" in Italian).

As a novice, she told the abbey founder, Lady Abbess Benedict Duss, "I will never have to worry again about being an actress because it was all over and behind me." The abbess replied, "I'm sorry, but you're completely wrong. Now you have to take up a role and really work at it." Hart described her reaction: "I was so mad when she said that because I really emptied my pockets, so to speak, and literally had given away everything that had meant anything to me." The abbess said, "I'm sorry you did that because there's a lot of things you gave away that you're going to need here." 

She initially took the religious name Sister Judith, but she changed it to Sister Dolores for her final vows. "Hal Wallis wanted to call me Susan when I started my movie career, but I was under age and my mother would not hear of it. She wanted me to be Dolores." She took her final vows in 1970. She chants in Latin eight times a day.

Hart visited Hollywood again in 2006 after 43 years in the abbey to raise awareness for idiopathic peripheral neuropathy disorder, a neurological disorder that afflicts her and many Americans. In April 2006 she testified at a Washington congressional hearing on the need for research of the painful and crippling disease amid her ordeal.

Hart, who was compared to Grace Kelly, was instrumental in developing the Abbey of Regina Laudis's project of expansion of its community connection through the arts, using her fame. Paul Newman helped her with funding for a lighting grid, when she envisioned a year-round arts school and a better-equipped stage. Another friend, the Academy Award-winning actress Patricia Neal, helped support the abbey's theater. Hart's vision was to meet the abbey's needs—development and expansion of its open-air theater and arts program for the Bethlehem community.

Hart was named prioress of the monastery in 2001, after the election of Mother David Serna as second abbess of Regina Laudis, and held that office until 2015. Hart remains a member of the Academy of Motion Picture Arts and Sciences, having in recent years become the only nun to be an Oscar-voting member.

Hart often appears in public wearing a beret on top of her habit. When asked about it by an interviewer she stated that early in her vocation, because nuns have to "cut your hair quite short in order to get your cap on, your wimple, your bandeau, and all of that", she told her superior that "my head is freezing even when I put the veil on!" When informed that she could "put another veil on top of it" she thought "oh, that's pretty dull isn't it? And someone gave me a little tam, so I asked if I could wear that." She was granted permission "and now a lot of the young ones [novices and other nuns] pick up the beret [because] they like it, but it's not actually part of our habit. It's part of our tradition that what helps a nun to be herself can certainly [be] a part of our system."

On October 4, 2008, the Holy Trinity Apostolate, founded by the Rev. John Hardon, S.J., sponsored a "Breakfast with Mother Dolores Hart". Held at Rochester, Michigan's Royal Park Hotel, Hart told her story: "He Led Me Out into an Open Space; He Saved Me Because He Loved Me: The Journey of Mother Dolores Hart to Regina Laudis". Since 1963, when she joined the Bethlehem abbey, she disciplined herself under the Rule of Saint Benedict. At the breakfast, several people spoke, including Patricia Neal and Maria Cooper Janis, the daughter of Hollywood leading man Gary Cooper.

A documentary film about Hart's life, God Is the Bigger Elvis, was a nominee for the 2012 Academy Award for Best Documentary (Short Subject) and was shown on HBO in April 2012. Hart attended the 2012 Academy Awards for the documentary; her last red-carpet Oscar event had been in 1959 as a Hollywood starlet.

In her autobiography, The Ear of the Heart: An Actress' Journey From Hollywood to Holy Vows (Ignatius Press)—co-authored with lifelong friend Richard DeNeut and released on May 7, 2013—Hart told her life story, from her birth in Chicago to becoming Catholic, from her Hollywood adventures to monastery life.

Filmography
{|class=wikitable width=42%
|+ Feature films
! width=2%|Year !! width=20%|Title !! width=20%|Role
|-
| rowspan=2|1957 || Loving You || Susan Jessup
|-
| Wild Is the Wind || Angie
|-
| rowspan=2|1958 || Lonelyhearts || Justy Sargent
|-
|  King Creole || Nellie
|-
| rowspan=2|1960 || The Plunderers || Ellie Walters
|-
| Where the Boys Are || Merritt Andrews
|-
|  rowspan=2|1961|| Francis of Assisi || Clare
|-
|  Sail a Crooked Ship || Elinor Harrison
|-
| 1962 || The Inspector A.K.A. Lisa || Lisa Held
|-
| 1963 || Come Fly with Me || Donna Stuart
|-
| 2011 || God Is the Bigger Elvis || Herself
|-
| 2015 || Tab Hunter Confidential  || Herself
|-
| 2017 || The Seven Ages of Elvis  || Herself
|}The Seven Ages of Elvis is a 90-minute UK feature documentary produced and directed by David Upshal, and broadcast by Sky Arts to mark the 40th anniversary of the death of Elvis Presley.

References

External links

 
 Abbey of Regina Laudis Web site
 "How A Movie Actress Left Hollywood for a Contract with God", Pittsburgh Post-Gazette The Ear of the Heart: An Actress' Journey from Hollywood to Holy Vows
 "A Cloistered Life" in Psychology Today''
 TVNow.com Dolores Hart"

American film actresses
American stage actresses
American television actresses
Benedictine abbesses
Actresses from Chicago
Writers from Chicago
Writers from Connecticut
People from Bethlehem, Connecticut
1938 births
Living people
20th-century American actresses
20th-century American Roman Catholic nuns
21st-century American Roman Catholic nuns
Catholics from Connecticut
21st-century American women